Ani Tsankhung Nunnery is a nunnery of the Gelug school of Tibetan Buddhism in the city of Lhasa, Tibet Autonomous Region, China.
It was built in the 15th century on a site that had been used for meditation by the  7th century Tibetan king Songtsen Gampo. The nuns support themselves through alms and manufacturing items such as clothing and printed texts.

Building

The word Ani mean "nun" and "tshamkhang" means a place for spiritual retreat, or hermitage.
Ani Tsankhung occupies a yellow building in the Barkhor area of downtown Lhasa.
It is southeast of the Jokhang temple, and is the only nunnery in the old city of Lhasa.
The building is three stories high.
In the main hall there is an image of Chenresig, the multi-armed Bodhisattva of Compassion.
Behind this there is a 7th-century meditation chamber that was used by Songtsen Gampo.
The nunnery has a collection of thirteen Thangkas from Ming and Qing dynasties depicting Buddhas and Bodhisattvas.

History

The 7th century Tibetan king Songtsen Gampo used to meditate at a natural cave in this location, and recited prayers to reduce the danger of flooding by the Lhasa River.
Doctor Gewahum meditated here in the 12th century.
Kujor Tokden, a close disciple of Tsongkhapa, established the nunnery in the 15th century.
The Tibetan Living Buddha Samding Dorje Phagmo began her life as a Buddhist at the monastery.
The Lama Pabongkhapa Déchen Nyingpo and Tampa Dhoedrak, throne holder of Ganden Monastery, enlarged the nunnery to its present size early in the 20th century.

The nunnery was closed for ten years during the Cultural Revolution, its statues destroyed and the nuns evicted.
Later it was allowed to reopen by the Lhasa Municipal Bureau of Religious Affairs.
Today there are more than one hundred resident nuns.

Activities

The youngest nuns are sixteen. The young women live on the ground floor and the older people live upstairs.
The nuns are poor, dependent on alms given for their prayers, and on manufacturing goods for sale.
Their work includes sewing, weaving and making handicrafts. They also have a small workshop where they print religious texts.
The nuns run an inexpensive outdoor restaurant, which is busy at lunch time, serving bowls of noodles and dumplings.

References

Sources

 

Buddhist monasteries in Lhasa
Buddhist nunneries in Tibet
Buddhist temples in Tibet
Gelug monasteries
Buildings and structures in Lhasa
Chengguan District, Lhasa